The 1989 Southern Conference baseball tournament was held in Asheville, North Carolina, from April 27 through 29. The South Division's top seed  won their fifth consecutive tournament and earned the Southern Conference's automatic bid to the 1989 NCAA Division I baseball tournament. Western Carolina claimed its fifth tournament title of the first six in modern SoCon history.

The tournament used a double-elimination format. Heavy rains forced the cancellation of the tournament after five games. A three team playoff was held in Montreat, North Carolina, between Appalachian State, Marshall, and Western Carolina to determine the automatic qualifier in the NCAA tournament.

Seeding 
With Davidson's departure from the conference beginning with the 1989 season, the Southern Conference did away with the divisional structure for a seven-team league. All seven teams were in the tournament for the first time, with seeding based on conference winning percentage. Furman claimed more wins over East Tennessee State in the regular season, and were awarded the sixth seed.

Bracket 

'''Three team playoff at Montreat, NC

Most Outstanding Player

References 

Tournament
Southern Conference Baseball Tournament
Southern Conference baseball tournament
Southern Conference baseball tournament